Loker or Lokero was a legendary Curonian king mentioned in Gesta Danorum. Exiled Danish prince, Hading and an old rover,  Lysir attacked his realm, but were defeated.

The text

References

Kings in Norse mythology and legends